Master Detective Archives: Rain Code is an upcoming adventure video game developed by Too Kyo Games and Spike Chunsoft, with the latter also publishing it. The game is scheduled to be released on June 30, 2023 for the Nintendo Switch.

Overview
Master Detective Archives: Rain Code is a fantasy-mystery adventure game set in a rainy city lit by neon lights. It follows the trainee detective Yuma, who is haunted by the spirit Shinigami.

Development and release

Rain Code is co-developed by Spike Chunsoft and Too Kyo Games, a company formed in 2017 by ex-employees of Spike Chunsoft. It is written by Kazutaka Kodaka and Takekuni Kitayama, and features music by Masafumi Takada and Jun Fukuda, and character designs by Rui Komatsuzaki and Shimadoriru; several key staff members previously worked on Spike Chunsoft's Danganronpa series.

Kodaka began the planning for the game in 2016 while he was still working at Spike Chunsoft. It is designed to be different from Danganronpa, with a dark fantasy setting influenced by the work of filmmaker Tim Burton, and uses 3D models throughout as opposed to Danganronpa blend of 3D environments and 2D characters (aka 2.5D graphics), although still features a similar psycho-pop aesthetic with neon colors. It is developed using the Unreal Engine.

The game was first teased by Too Kyo Games in 2018 with a piece of concept art showing a rainy city and a ghost, and was announced in November 2021 as Enigma Archives: Rain Code. In September 2022, it was retitled Master Detective Archives: Rain Code, and was announced for release in Q2 2023 on the Nintendo Switch by Spike Chunsoft.

Notes

References

External links
 

Adventure games
Dark fantasy video games
Mystery video games
Nintendo Switch games
Nintendo Switch-only games
Spike Chunsoft video games
Unreal Engine games
Upcoming video games scheduled for 2023
Video games developed in Japan
Video games scored by Masafumi Takada
Too Kyo Games games